Idoani is a quiet small town in Ondo State of Nigeria where the Federal Government College, Idoani, is located.
It is the seat of the Idoani Confederacy, a Nigerian traditional state.

Idoani is under the Ose local government in Ondo state. The ruling house is composed of the Royal Families: Owusi, Sadibo, and Ologbosere royal families.  The people of Idoani whose major occupation used to be farming, are peace-loving. The people speak Bini languages, some of which are different from the major Yoruba language of the south-western Nigeria. Quite a number of people still ride their bicycles to farm (a growing culture in the western world today). Idoani comprises six major quarters of Isure, Okedo street, Amusigbo, Iyayu, Isure and Ako. There is also Owani (Idosale, a few kilometres away). The different quarters are contiguous (with the exception of Owani which is a few kilometres away) and are not separated with any walls or boundaries, making intermarriage between them very common. The differences between the six quarters is noticeable in the languages. Iyayu language has been described as non-Yoruba, while others' have all Yoruba linguistic affinity. As a matter of historical fact, the Isure, Iyayus, Amusigbos, Owanis and the rest have different historical background. Another school of thought is that they are one family. Idoani is the point where the southern and western Nigeria meeting.

History 
The origin of Idoani dates back to the 15th century during the traditional state of Idoani Confederacy, when the Oba Ozolua of the Benin Empire fathered the Alani of Idoani, subsequently making it a vassal state and Idoani as the seat of the state.

Western influence 
The influence of colonization in Idoani culture is minimal. There are Anglican, Christ Apostolic Church, Methodist and Roman Catholic churches in Idoani. The two notable high schools are: Federal Government College, Idoani and Irekari Grammar school. There are now some private primary and secondary schools. They still speak their local languages, there are no major fast food outlet in the town, like those found in the major cities in Nigeria. The people eat Bini traditional food such as "Iyan" (pounded yam) with egusi or any of the vegetable soup and "Agidi"/igidi, made from maize flour (the two types are: Agidi a furere and Tepotiyo).

Idoani is a peaceful holiday destination in Nigeria, there is an important annual masquerade festival, around August, during which a lot of its indigenes come home from all over the world. Notable masquerades (Jejeliki), known for great dancing, and Igweztan, known for tormenting the stubborn children with canes (whips). There are other masquerades like Egunle, Ela, and Eruerue, Aloro, Okeripe (Isure quarters).

Gallery

See also
Federal Government College, Idoani
Holy Trinity Anglican Church, Idoani

References

Populated places in Ondo State
Towns in Yorubaland